Sailing/Yachting is an Olympic sport starting from the Games of the 1st Olympiad (1896 Olympics in Athens, Greece). With the exception of 1904 and possibly the cancelled 1916 Summer Olympics, sailing has always been included on the Olympic schedule. The Sailing program of 2008 consisted of a total of nine sailing classes (eleven disciplines). Eleven races are scheduled for each event except for the 49er class, for which 16 races are scheduled from 9 August 2008 to 21 August 2008 of the coast of the Qingdao International Sailing Centre facing the Yellow Sea. Of the 11 (16) races, 10 (15) are scheduled as opening races and one as a medal race. The sailing was done on four different types of courses.

Venue 

According to the IOC statutes the contests in all sport disciplines must be held either in, or as close as possible to the city which the IOC has chosen. Among others, an exception is made for the Olympic yachting events, which customarily must be staged on the open sea. On account of this principle, Qingdao was selected for the honor to carry out the Olympic yachting regattas. For that purpose the Qingdao International Sailing Centre was constructed.

Qingdao International Sailing Centre (QISC) 

The land based part of the QISC covers approximately 45 hectares and includes: 
 Administrative and game management center
 Olympic and athletes village
 Media center
 Logistics supply center
 National sailing center, International yacht club with seaside marina
 International passenger liner terminal
 International conference center with five-star hotel
 Shopping and amusement center, parks and public squares.  
The offshore part of the complex included:
 The main seawall
 The secondary seawall
 The jetty wharf
 The Olympic wharf

Course areas 
A total of five race areas were set on the Yellow Sea of the coast of Qingdao.
The location points to the center of the 0.6 nm radius circle for course area A & B and to a 0.75 nm radius circle for course area's C D and E.

Competition

Overview

Continents 
 Africa
 Asia
 Oceania
 Europe
 North America
 South America

Countries

Classes (equipment)

Race schedule

Medal summary

Women's events

Men's events

Open events

Medal table

See also 
Sailing at the 2008 Summer Paralympics

Further reading

References

Sources
 
 
 
 
 
 

 
2008 Summer Olympics events
2008
2008 in sailing
Sport in Qingdao
Sailing competitions in China